John Adrian Pienaar (born 2 October 1956) is a British journalist who currently works for Times Radio, previously rising to prominence as deputy political editor for BBC News.

Early life
Pienaar was born in Middlesex. His parents, Eric and Johanna Pienaar, were both born in South Africa. He was educated at Bromley Technical High School, in Keston, Bromley, London, as one of just two black boys at his local technical college. He then obtained his NCTJ training at Highbury College, Portsmouth.

Career
Pienaar began his career in journalism at the South London Press, before becoming an Old Bailey correspondent. He was then a political correspondent at The Independent, the Press Association, and from 1992 the BBC, on a range of TV and radio news and current affairs programmes.

In 2002, he became chief political correspondent at Radio 5 Live, and presented a Sunday morning programme, Pienaar's Politics. He also hosted Question Time Extra Time (a radio supplement to BBC One's Question Time) alongside Stephen Nolan and served as a stand-in host on BBC Two's Daily Politics. From 2015 to 2020 he was BBC News' deputy political editor.

Pienaar started presenting the drivetime programme on the new Times Radio station in June 2020.

Personal life
Pienaar married Denise Walsh in 1980 and they had a son and a daughter. They divorced and Pienaar married Penny Davies, with whom he has two daughters.

He is a fan of Crystal Palace Football Club.

References

External links

1956 births
Living people
People from Middlesex
BBC newsreaders and journalists
Alumni of the University of Bradford
British political commentators
BBC Radio 5 Live presenters
British social commentators
Black British journalists
English people of South African descent